Petrulis is a Lithuanian language family name. It may refer to:

Vytautas Petrulis, Lithuanian politician
Algirdas Petrulis, Lithuanian painter
Alfonsas Petrulis

Lithuanian-language surnames